Fenistil is a brand name for some over the counter medications distributed by GlaxoSmithKline and Novartis.

Products include:
 Fenistil Gel, containing dimetindene
 Fenistil Cold Sore Cream, containing penciclovir
 FeniHydrocort, containing cortisol